The 1991–92 Charlotte 49ers men's basketball team represented the University of North Carolina at Charlotte in the 1991–92 college basketball season. This was head coach Jeff Mullins's seventh season at Charlotte. The 49ers competed in the Metro Conference and played their home games at Dale F. Halton Arena. They finished the season 23–9 (7–5 in Metro play) and won the Metro Conference tournament to receive an automatic bid to the 1992 NCAA tournament. The 49ers lost in the opening round to Iowa State.

Roster

Schedule and results

|-
!colspan=9 style=| Regular season

|-
!colspan=9 style=| Metro Conference tournament

|-
!colspan=9 style=| NCAA tournament

Rankings

Players in the 1992 NBA draft

References

UNC Charlotte
Charlotte 49ers men's basketball seasons
UNC Charlotte
UNC Charlotte 49ers men's basket
UNC Charlotte 49ers men's basket